Dons or The Dons may refer to:

Association football
 Aberdeen F.C., a Scottish professional football club
 Hendon F.C., an English semi-professional football club
 Wimbledon F.C., a former English professional football club from London which relocated to Milton Keynes in 2003, and the two clubs that emerged from the surrounding controversy:
 AFC Wimbledon, founded by disaffected Wimbledon F.C. supporters in 2002
 Milton Keynes Dons F.C., as Wimbledon F.C. was renamed in 2004

Other sports
 Doncaster R.L.F.C., an English rugby league club from Doncaster, South Yorkshire
 Dorton Dons, a tug-of-war team based in Dorton, Buckinghamshire
 Essendon Football Club, an Australian rules football club
 The Los Angeles Dons, an American football team that played in the defunct All-America Football Conference in 1946–49
 The athletic teams of Loyola Blakefield school in Maryland
 San Francisco Dons, the athletic teams of the University of San Francisco, California
 Wimbledon Dons, an English motorcycle speedway team from Wimbledon, London

People
 Aage Dons (1903–1993), Danish writer
 Christian Dons
 Erik Dons (1915–2002), Norwegian diplomat
 Hans Dons (1882–1940), Norwegian naval officer and aviator
 Henny Dons (1874–1966), Norwegian educator and inner missionary
 Dons (singer) (born 1984), Latvian singer

Other uses
 The Dons, an area in Baldwin Hills, Los Angeles
 Dons, Santa Barbara High School mascot
 dons (unit), small Korean units of weight
 McDonald's, American fast food chain

See also
 Don (disambiguation)